The Bicycle Ride Across Georgia (BRAG) is an annual road-cycling tour across the US state of Georgia.  It began in 1980 as an offshoot of RAGBRAI. Between 1,000 and 2,000 riders participate in this great ride every year.

The route covers approximately 400 miles over 7 days with options for longer distances.  Mid-week, the tour stays two nights in one town allowing riders to either rest or ride a century with lesser mile options.  Rest stops are every 8–15 miles and snacks and drinks are provided to registered riders.

History
BRAG was originally called Georgia's Annual State Bicycling Event (GASBE) when it first began in 1980. The head leader on the idea for this event was Dot Moss. The inspiration originally came from the bicycle tour in Iowa called RAGBRAI (Register's Annual Great Bicycle Ride Across Iowa). The first ride began in Savannah, Georgia, and finished in Columbus, Georgia. The ride was a total of 300 miles. In 1985, the name of the ride was changed to Bicycle Ride Across Georgia or BRAG. Originally the tour was organized by local bike shops and each year a different bike shop would take on the organization and promotion of the event. As the event grew, it became obvious that the event would require a full time staff. An executive director, Jerry Colley, was hired as the Chief Executive Officer and held that position until 2015, when Franklin Johnson took over as Executive Director.

Preparation

Training
For BRAG, many riders start training in January. Bobby Rone, a BRAG cyclist, makes the following suggestions:
Beginning in January, try to ride once a week if the weather is above 45 degrees.
Do short loops at first - 10 to 15 miles.
After time changes and warmer weather begins in April, try to ride 20 or 30 miles, 3 or 4 days a week.
Strive for equal amounts of intensity rides, versus distance rides.
In late May, around Memorial Day, each ride should be 60 to 70 miles.
Rone says that after following his training strategy, the BRAG ride “is very easy and enjoyable.”

The Trail
BRAG volunteers choose the route each year and when the time comes around, they help paint the arrows and other lines on the pavement. They also post BRAG signs to help bikers out. The volunteers also pre-bike the ride to make sure it is a good route for cyclists from all over. When the registration papers and fees are collected for each rider, an envelope is sent back to the rider, with information about the ride and precise distances and directions for every turn. For example, a directions packet might say something like this, “Begin a 1.2 mile serious climb…” They are made easy to follow.

Riders on the Trail
Everyone has their own reason to ride on BRAG. Many ride to keep in shape, many ride to accomplish a personal goal or complete a personal challenge, many ride for fun with family and/or friends, or on their own, as a hobby. And others ride to enjoy scenery, different terrain, and new country. On BRAG, almost all riders believe that it is more about the journey, rather than the destination.
Riders may choose to complete as much or as little of the tour as they want to. This means each rider may travel a different distance during the week.
On average, each rider travels between 43 and 100 miles in a day. Each day of riding is pre-mapped out and planned so riders know where to go and what kind of trek is ahead for each day. When the trek for the day is complete, the cyclists stop in a city or town, and set up camp at a local high school or college. In the evenings, bikers can relax or enjoy entertainment and tourism for the remainder of the night. If riders want to go out, a shuttle provides transportation between the camp site and touristic spots around town. At the camp site, riders can choose to either set up camp outside, in a tent, on a field -most likely a soccer or football field-, or inside in a gym.
In the morning, most riders begin riding early to avoid the heat.
Most of the routes are back roads with beautiful scenery and little traffic. Official BRAG rest stops are spaced every 10 to 15 miles and provide drinks and snacks to riders. Organizers suggest that riders not stop longer than 5 minutes to avoid difficulty restarting that may come from lactic acid.
Cyclists not able to take the heat (average temperature is usually around 90 degrees Fahrenheit) or not able to ride up a hill can be picked up by BRAG support wagons. Those not able to bike for a couple days can also use the support wagons to transport them, their bike, and, gear to the next stop on the route if necessary.
Riders can purchase a meal ticket plan for the week. Cyclists can choose how many meals they want on their plan. Breakfast, lunch, and dinner are available. According to Fitz Miller, “The food is good to excellent and the prices are very reasonable.”

Miscellaneous Information
BRAG experts and experienced trekkers advise that participants ensure their bikes are tuned up and in good condition for the ride. They also advise that riders stick to a consistent cadence (pedaling speed) of at least 80 revolutions per minute, and know how to operate their gears correctly.

Tours, Stops, and Dates

2022 BRAG
The route for the 2022 Big BRAG began Saturday, June 4 in Columbus, GA and ended on Saturday, June 11 in Brunswick, GA. Riders stopped overnight in the following locations:

Sunday, June 5 - Thomaston, GA - Thomaston-Upson Civic Center
Monday, June 6 - Perry, GA - Georgia National Fairgrounds
Tuesday & Wednesday, June 7–8 - Dublin, GA - Stubbs Park
Thursday, June 9 - Hazlehurst, GA - Jeff Davis High School
Friday, June 10 - Jesup, GA - Wayne County High School
Saturday, June 11 - Brunswick, GA - Veterans Memorial Park

2019 BRAG
The route for the 2019 BRAG began Saturday, June 1 in Ellijay, GA and ended on Saturday, June 8 in Darien, GA. Riders stopped overnight in the following locations:

Sunday, June 2 - Gainesville, GA - Lake Lanier Olympic Park
Monday, June 3 - Covington, GA - Indian Creek Middle School
Tuesday & Wednesday, June 4–5 - Milledgeville, GA - GCSU Centennial Center
Thursday, June 6 - Swainsboro, GA - East Georgia State College
Friday, June 7 - Hinesville, GA - Shuman Recreation Center
Saturday, June 8 - Darien, GA - Darien River Waterfront Park & Docks

2017 BRAG
The route for the 2017 BRAG began Saturday, June 3 in Athens, GA and ended on Saturday, June 10 in Brunswick, GA. Riders stopped overnight in the following locations:

Sunday, June 4 - Washington, GA - Pope Center
Monday, June 5 - Thomson, GA - McDuffie Achievement Center (School)
Tuesday & Wednesday, June 6–7 - Louisville, GA - Louisville Academy / Helen Clark Park
Thursday, June 8 - Metter, GA - Metter Elementary School
Friday, June 9 - Jesup, GA - Wayne County High School
Saturday, June 10 - Brunswick, GA - Mary Ross Waterfront Park

2016 BRAG
The route for the 2016 BRAG began Saturday, June 4 in Atlanta, GA and ended on Saturday, June 11 in Savannah, GA. Riders stopped overnight in the following locations:

Sunday, June 5 - Social Circle, GA - Social Circle Middle-High School
Monday, June 6 - Milledgeville, GA - GCSU Centennial Center
Tuesday & Wednesday, June 7-8 - Dublin, GA - Stubbs Park
Thursday, June 9 - Swainsboro, GA - East Georgia State College
Friday, June 10 - Statesboro, GA - Georgia Southern University
Saturday, June 11 - Savannah, GA - Emmet Park

2015 BRAG
The proposed route for the 2015 BRAG will be a loop/figure 8 course and not a point-to-point ride. 2015 BRAG will begin Sunday, June 7 in Newnan, GA and will end on Saturday, June 13 also in Newnan. Riders will stop overnight in the following locations:

Monday, June 8 - Carrollton, GA
Tuesday & Wednesday, June 9–10 - Newnan, GA
Thursday & Friday, June 11–12 - LaGrange, GA
Saturday, June 13 - Newnan, GA

2014 BRAG
The route for the 2014 BRAG began Sunday, June 8 in Washington, GA and ended on Saturday, June 14 in Darien, GA. Riders stopped overnight in the following locations:

Monday, June 9 - Thomson, GA - Thomson High School
Tuesday & Wednesday, June 10–11 - Waynesboro, GA - Burke County Middle School
Thursday, June 12 - Metter, GA - Metter High School
Friday, June 13 - Jesup, GA - Wayne County High School
Saturday, June 14 - Darien, GA - Darien Waterfront Park

2012 BRAG
The route for the 2012 BRAG began Saturday, June 2 in Fort Oglethorpe, GA and ended on Saturday, June 9 in Tiger, GA. Riders stopped overnight in the following locations:

Sunday, June 3 - Dalton, GA - Dalton High School
Monday, June 4 - Jasper, GA - Pickens County Community Center
Tuesday & Wednesday, June 5–6 - Roswell, GA - Roswell High School
Thursday, June 7 - Winder, GA - Winder Barrow High School
Friday, June 8 - Mount Airy, GA - Habersham 9th Grade Academy
Saturday, June 9 - Tiger, GA - Rabun County High School

2011 BRAG
The route for the 2011 BRAG began Saturday, June 4 in Atlanta, GA and ended on Saturday, June 11 in Savannah, GA. Riders stopped overnight in the following locations:

Sunday, June 5 - Oxford, GA - Emory University at Oxford
Monday, June 6 - Milledgeville, GA - Georgia Military College
Tuesday & Wednesday, June 7–8 - Dublin, GA - Dublin High School
Thursday, June 9 - Metter, GA - Metter High School
Friday, June 10 - Hinesville, GA - Snelson-Golden Middle School
Saturday, June 11 - Savannah, GA - Armstrong Atlantic State University

2010 BRAG
The route for the 2010 BRAG began Saturday, June 5 in Peachtree City, GA and ended on Saturday, June 12, also in Peachtree City. Riders stopped overnight in the following locations:

Sunday, June 6 - Griffin, GA
Monday, June 7 - Thomaston, GA
Tuesday & Wednesday, June 8–9 - Columbus, GA
Thursday, June 10 - LaGrange, GA
Friday, June 11 - Newnan, GA

2009 BRAG
The route for the 2009 BRAG began Sunday, June 7, in Hiawassee, Georgia and ended in South Carolina at the Savannah Lakes Resort and Marina on Saturday, June 13. 2009. Riders stopped overnight in the following towns:

 Sunday, June 7 - Dahlonega, GA - Lumpkin County Middle School 
 Monday, June 8 - Mount Airy, GA - Habersham Central High School
 Tuesday & Wednesday, June 9–10 - Athens, GA - Clarke Middle School
 Thursday, June 11 - Elberton, GA - Elbert County Comprehensive High School
 Friday, June 12 - Washington, GA - Washington-Wilkes Comprehensive High School
 Saturday, June 13 - near McCormick, SC - Savannah Lakes Resort & Marina

2008 BRAG
The route for the 2008 BRAG began Sunday, June 8 in Oxford, GA and ended on St. Simons Island, GA on Saturday, June 14.  2008's route stopped overnight in the following towns:

 Sunday, June 8 - Griffin, GA - Spalding High School
 Monday, June 9 - Macon, GA - First Presbyterian Day School
 Tuesday & Wednesday, June 10–11 - Dublin, GA - Dublin High School
 Thursday, June 12 - Hazlehurst, GA - Jeff Davis County High School
 Friday, June 13 - Jesup, GA - Wayne County High School
 Saturday, June 14 - St. Simons Island, GA - Neptune Park

2007 BRAG
The route for the 2007 BRAG began Sunday, June 9 in Columbus, GA and ended in Savannah, GA on Saturday, June 16. Overnight stops were in the following towns:
Sunday, June 10 - Americus, GA - Georgia Southwestern State University 
Monday, June 11 - Cordele, GA - Crisp County High School
Tuesday & Wednesday, June 12–13 - Douglas, GA - South Georgia College
Thursday, June 14 - Baxley, GA - Appling County Comp High School
Friday, June 15 - Hinesville, GA - Bradwell Institute
Saturday, June 16 - Savannah, GA - Grayson Stadium/Daffin Park

See also
Cycling
Bicycle touring
Cycling in Atlanta

References

External links
The BRAG Web Site

Bicycle tours
Cycling events in the United States